Low-complexity art, first described by Jürgen Schmidhuber in 1997 and now established as a seminal topic within the larger field of computer science, is art that can be described by a short computer program (that is, a computer program of small Kolmogorov complexity).

Overview

Schmidhuber characterizes low-complexity art as the computer age equivalent of minimal art. He also describes an algorithmic theory of beauty and aesthetics based on the principles of algorithmic information theory and minimum description length. It explicitly addresses the subjectivity of the observer and postulates that among several input data classified as comparable by a given subjective observer, the most pleasing one has the shortest description, given the observer's previous knowledge and his or her particular method for encoding the data. For example, mathematicians enjoy simple proofs with a short description in their formal language (sometimes called mathematical beauty). Another example draws inspiration from 15th century proportion studies by Leonardo da Vinci and Albrecht Dürer: the proportions of a beautiful human face can be described by very few bits of information.

Schmidhuber explicitly distinguishes between beauty and interestingness. He assumes that any observer continually tries to improve the predictability and  compressibility of the observations by discovering regularities such as repetitions and  symmetries and fractal self-similarity. When the observer's learning process (which may be a predictive neural network) leads to improved data compression the number of bits required to describe the data decreases. The temporary interestingness of the data corresponds to the number of saved bits, and thus (in the continuum limit) to the first derivative of subjectively perceived beauty.  A reinforcement learning algorithm can be used to maximize the future expected data compression progress. It will motivate the learning observer to execute action sequences that cause additional interesting input data with yet unknown but learnable predictability or regularity. The principles can be implemented on artificial agents which then exhibit a form of artificial curiosity.

While low-complexity art does not require a priori restrictions of the description size, the basic ideas are related to the size-restricted intro categories of the demoscene, where very short computer programs are used to generate pleasing graphical and musical output. Very small (usually C) programs that create music have been written: the style of this music has come to be called "bytebeat".

The larger context
The larger context provided by the histories of both art and science suggests that low-complexity art will continue to be a topic of growing interest. In respect to art history, the potential relevance of low-complexity art extends far beyond the minimalistic Renaissance encoding of beauty already cited in its literature.  The idea of an intimate relationship between mathematical structure and visual appeal is one of the recurring themes of Western art and is prominent during several of its periods of fluorescence including that of dynastic Egypt; Greece of the classic era; the Renaissance (as already noted); and on into the Geometric abstraction of the 20th century, especially as practiced by Georges Vantongerloo and Max Bill. 

In science and technology, low-complexity art may represent another case in which the relatively new discipline of computer science is able to shed fresh light on a disparate subject — an example being insights into the functioning of the genetic code garnered because of familiarity with issues already raised in the practice of software engineering. The topic of low-complexity art is expected to help foster a continued and fruitful interaction between the fields of computer science and aesthetics.  Nor will the insights gained be purely qualitative; the formalizations on which low-complexity art is based are essentially quantitative.

See also
 Infinite compositions of analytic functions

References

External links
 Schmidhuber's Papers on Low-Complexity Art & Theory of Subjective Beauty
 Schmidhuber's Papers on Interestingness as the First Derivative of Subjective Beauty
 Examples of  Low-Complexity Art in a German TV show (May 2008)

Computer art
Computational complexity theory